Zbrachlin is the name of two villages in the Kuyavian-Pomeranian Voivodeship of Poland:

 Zbrachlin, Aleksandrów County
 Zbrachlin, Świecie County